Goliyon Ki Raasleela Ram-Leela or simply known as Ram-Leela, is a 2013 Indian Hindi-language tragic romantic drama film written and directed by Sanjay Leela Bhansali, who also composed its original soundtrack. The film was jointly produced by Bhansali and Eros International's Kishore Lulla; it stars Deepika Padukone and Ranveer Singh. The supporting cast includes Supriya Pathak, Richa Chadda, Sharad Kelkar, Gulshan Devaiah, Barkha Bisht Sengupta, and Abhimanyu Singh. Priyanka Chopra made a cameo appearance in the song "Ram Chahe Leela". Based on the tragedy Romeo and Juliet by William Shakespeare, Ram-Leela narrates the star-crossed romance between the two eponymous lovers, who belong to warring factions but fall in love with each other.

Bhansali conceived Ram-Leela while working on his directional debut Khamoshi: The Musical; an insufficient budget led to the project being postponed. After reviving the project in 2012, Padukone and Singh were cast in the lead roles over many other choices. Principal photography began in Gujarat before moving to Rajasthan. Much of the filming was done on sets, despite previous plans against doing so. The background score was composed by Monty Sharma, while the lyrics were written by Siddharth–Garima.

The film's release, scheduled on 15 November 2013, was stayed by Delhi High Court. The film initially titled Ram-Leela was changed to Goliyon Ki Raasleela Ram-Leela in response to an order by the court, allowing it to release on the scheduled date. It received positive reviews, with praise directed to the performances of the cast members, particularly Padukone and Singh. Criticism was focused on its plot and elements of violence. Ram-Leela earned 220.58 crore in its theatrical run and emerged as the fifth highest-grossing Indian film of the year.

Ram-Leela received eight nominations at the Filmfare Awards, winning three including Filmfare Award for Best Actress for Padukone and Filmfare Award for Best Supporting Actress for Pathak. At the International Indian Film Academy Awards, it received nine nominations, including for Best Film, and won two.

Plot 
In the fictional Gujarati village Ranjhaar, infamous for its uninhibited manufacture and sale of arms and ammunition, two clans—Rajadi and Sanera—have been at odds with each other for the past 500 years. A violent altercation between the two occurs after Bhavani, a Sanera, fires at the son of Meghji Bhai, a Rajadi chieftain. Bhavani is almost killed by Meghji Bhai, but Ram (played by Ranveer Singh), Meghji Bhai's younger brother, intervenes and saves Bhavani. All the Rajadi elders are irked by Ram being a vagabond who deals in stolen cars, with his mindset of making a truce with the other clan.

During the festival of Holi, Ram boldly enters the house of the Sanera heads and flirts with Leela (played by Deepika Padukone). Meanwhile, her mother, Dhankor Baa, the chieftan of the Saneras, is busy arranging a match for her daughter with a simple-minded NRI. Leela's elder brother, Kanji Bhai, is angered by Ram's entry into the house and bribes the local police to raid Ram's house. Ram, however, manages to convince the policemen to leave in exchange for a set of his blue films. Ram and Leela develop a romance and plan to elope, but a grim turn of events follows when Kanji accidentally kills Meghji, Ram's brother, and is, in turn, killed by Ram.

To escape the suffering, Ram and Leela elope and marry, but just as they are about to consummate their marriage, Ram's friends trace them and betray him by inebriating him and informing Leela's family of their location. The next morning, Leela is forcibly taken back home by Bhavani, her cousin, while Ram is hailed as a hero by the Rajadis for soiling Leela's reputation. He is rewarded by being made the new chieftain of the Rajadis.

Meanwhile, Dhankor Baa arranges the engagement of Leela and the NRI, much to the chagrin of the pair. Leela refuses, citing that her finger is already occupied by the ring from her marriage to Ram. In her anger, Dhankor Baa chops off Leela's finger. Upon learning of this, Ram does the same to his own finger and visits Leela while she is asleep. Leela still retains faith in Ram and sends Rasila, the widow of Kanji, to give Ram an ultimatum to take her away. Rasila is assaulted by Ram's friends, and when Dhankor Baa learns of this, she sends Bhavani and other men to assault Kesar, Meghji's widow, who manages to evade them.

In response to the attempt on Kesar, Ram storms into Leela's house and incapacitates the guards single-handedly. He then requests Dhankor Baa to consider negotiation for peace, and she invites him to celebrate Navratri with the Saneras, with the intention of having him killed. However, at the event, Bhavani secretly shoots and seriously injures Dhankor Baa to place the blame on the Rajadi. Leela is made the chieftain of the Saneras and gets busy tending to her mother. She bitterly carries out a negotiation with Ram, equally dividing the travel routes and trades, with the condition that the Saneras and Rajadis will not interact with each other ever again.

Bhavani, who does not tolerate this development, deceives Leela into blindly signing a document that orders unrestrained killings of the Rajadis. During Dusshera, as the Ramlila parade is ending, many of the Rajadis are killed, and the village is on the brink of war, which Ram senses. Ram and Leela realise that they are soulmates and shoot one another dead, all the while oblivious to the fact that Dhankor Baa has undergone a change of heart and has killed Bhavani, ordering that peace be made with the other clan. The two clans come together to cremate the bodies of the lovers.

Cast
Deepika Padukone as Leela Sanera, based on Juliet Capulet
Ranveer Singh as Ram Rajadi, based on Romeo Montague
Supriya Pathak Kapur as Dhankor Sanera (known as Dhankor Baa), based on Lady Capulet
Homi Wadia as Radhu Bhai
Abhimanyu Singh as Meghji Bhai, based on Mercutio
Richa Chadda as Rasila, based on Nurse
Gulshan Devaiah as Bhavani, based on Paris
Jameel Khan as Vanka
Sharad Kelkar as Kanji Bhai, based on Tybalt
Barkha Sengupta as Kesar
Anshul Trivedi as Mandar
Raza Murad as Sarpanch
Tarun Anand as Ujjwal
Masood Akhtar as Pujalal
Mukesh Agrohari as Vallu
Faizan Khan as Goli, Meghji Bhai and Kesars' son
Banwari Jhol as Popat
Priyanka Chopra in the song "Ram Chahe Leela" (special appearance)

Production

Development

Bhansali conceived Ram-Leela while directing Khamoshi: The Musical. The latter was critically acclaimed but commercially unsuccessful, leaving Bhansali with no money to fund Ram-Leela. He next directed Hum Dil De Chuke Sanam instead, which was also set in Gujarat like Ram-Leela. Feeling that directing two films set in the same place would be repetitive, Bhansali waited. He intended the film to be a tribute to Gujarat, saying, "I am Gujarati at heart. I love Gujarat's music, culture and food and I want to take all this back to the people." The film was dedicated to Bhansali's mother Leela. According to him, Ram-Leela was his "most violent film" at that point, while the filmmaking style was similar to his previous directional ventures Hum Dil De Chuke Sanam and Devdas.

Bhansali called it a "desi adaptation" of William Shakespeare's tragedy Romeo and Juliet. He clarified that Ram-Leela is not related to Rama
or Krishna and that the character Ram does not depict the Hindu god. Speaking about the influence of his childhood environment on the film, Bhansali said that his family members used to speak "the most outrageously uninhibited things as though they were the most natural". He felt that the language heard by him were idioms for the current generation, who speak directly. Bhansali found it "very liberating to explore the union of body and mind in a love-relationship" and felt that it wasn't enough "to show a boy and a girl looking at one another when they fall in love". The lovers don't have sex together in the film as Bhansali felt the importance of showing the lovers "united completely in death".

Terming Romeo and Juliet as "the mother of all love stories", Bhansali wanted to make a different story with it, one that was not yet explored in cinematic adaptations. While changing many aspects of the film, Bhansali kept the theme of "misunderstanding between star-crossed lovers", while transposing them to another level. The idea of a feud between two families that destroys everything really appealed to him. According to Bhansali, "the whole execution of Shakespeare is more flirtatious and voluptuous" and he felt his film was the best interpretation of Romeo and Juliet. When asked about the extensive violence and guns in the film, he said that violence is "an integral part" of Romeo and Juliet, also stating how important it was for a filmmaker "to get out of his comfort zone".

The screenplay was written by writing duo Siddharth-Garima. Producer Sandip Ssingh offered the duo three films; they chose Ram-Leela over the other two. They were impressed by its outline and felt that it was similar to Australian writer Baz Luhrmann's films. In addition to writing, they collaborated with Bhansali for the costumes, recces, shoot days, editing, subtitling, and post production. After writing the initial screenplay draft, Siddarth-Garima were sent to Gujarat for researching dialect, slang and accent.

Rhyming couplets from Romeo and Juliet were translated into Hindi and used in the film, with more emphasis on innuendo and humor as they felt that the elements were "overshadowed" by tragedy in the original play.

Cast and characters

Pakistani actor Imran Abbas was the first choice for Ram, he rejected the role due to "contractual obligations". Kareena Kapoor and Ranveer Singh were cast in the lead roles in the film. Singh later confirmed the news and conveyed his excitement on working with Kapoor. Bhansali was impressed with Singh's performance in Band Baaja Baaraat and cast him for the film. However, Kapoor walked out of the film 10 days before the shoot began and instead did Dharma Productions's romantic comedy Gori Tere Pyaar Mein. With already-complete sets and an approaching filming schedule, Bhansali approached Priyanka Chopra who agreed to do the film. Chopra was officially cast for Leela in July 2012 and was to start filming in August. However, before the filming started Bhansali brought Deepika Padukone in the film. After this unpleasant experience with Bhansali, Chopra stopped talking to Bhansali, as confirmed by the CEO of Bhansali Productions. In August 2012, Padukone had publicly expressed her desire to be a part of the film. After wrapping the filming of his previous film Lootera, Singh confirmed that he was signed on for the film in August 2012.

 
In an interview Bhansali revealed that he met Padukone with the script while she was ill; impressed with her beauty and watery eyes, he cast her. Richa Chadda was reportedly signed on to play a significant role, cast by Shruti Mahajan and Parag Mehta. Although she initially denied the claim, Chadda later agreed to play the role; she was not given the entire script until a month of filming.
For Chadda's role, Bhansali wanted someone "with a dusky complexion and Indian features", hence she was selected. Bhansali ordered Chadda to watch Mirch Masala to prepare for her look, which was inspired by Smita Patil. Chadda also attempted to mimic Patil's acting. Barkha Bisht Sengupta, a television actress, plays a supporting role. Sengupta was asked by Bhansali to forget acting for her role. Gulshan Devaiah was reported to play the role of the antagonist Bhavani. Devaiah said that his character was from the Jadeja clan and has "enough shades of grey" and was "nothing" like he had done in his career at that point. Devaiah felt that other than the basic frame, Ram-Leela wasn't similar to Romeo and Juliet.

Singh, who plays a Gujarati boy, had to learn some Gujarati abuses as well as gain muscle for his character in the film. Singh enrolled for a 12-week transformation programme with Stevens, going on a strict protein diet which involved eating every 2 hours. He managed to get the required look in 6 weeks. He was put on a diet of fish, broccoli, turkey and green tea and was prevented from eating roti, rice or sweets. Singh said, "I had to work out one hour in the morning and one hour in the evening. I would work out at 5 in the morning, start shooting from 9, shoot for the entire day till 6 pm and then return to workout for an hour again." He felt that the fact he didn't consume alcohol more than once or twice a year helped him to achieve the result before the required date.

Padukone was shown wearing a 30 kg ghagra with a 50-metre 'ghera' in the first look of Ram-Leela. Padukone felt that the film was "tough" for her, stating that it was "mentally, physically, and emotionally demanding" for her. She attributes Bhansali's perfectionist outlook as the reason, while admitting she became emotional on the set. For the song Nagada Song Dhol, Padukone had to learn Garba. According to her, the Garba performed in the film was a folk one, rather than the commercial ones often played. Bhansali ordered Padukone and Singh to spend time together to develop their romantic chemistry. Padukone spent more than 12 hours a day for the workshop, which involved partying, watch films and attending premieres together with Singh. Since the two weren't familiar with each other, Bhansali wanted them to socialise.

There were rumours that Madhuri Dixit would be performing an item number for the film. Other actresses were also speculated to be signed for the song including Aishwarya Rai and Priyanka Chopra. Chopra was eventually reported to be performing the song. She confirmed the news, saying that she "loved the song from the time [she] first heard it" and she "was challenged to push [her] boundaries." Chopra had to wear full sleeves to hide her muscles acquired for playing the titular character in Mary Kom. The actress also had to workout to lose some of her muscles.

Production design

Wasiq Khan was the production designer for Ram-Leela. Khan finished working on Rowdy Rathore, a film produced by Bhansali, when he was called for Ram-Leela. According to Khan, Bhansali sometimes took 3 to 5 hours for one shot to achieve "perfection". Since Bhansali wanted to focus on Gujarat's architecture and royal havelis, the film was to be "grand and larger than life". He said that the challenge was to make the film both a romance and action film as the film would have a "rustic feel and texture" depicting action scenes, with many people fighting. Khan found it hard to maintain his realistic designs with Bhansali's "grand sets, big shots, and beautiful costumes". Ram-Leelas design and narrative were influenced by the "craft traditions and folk culture" of houses in the Kutch region of Gujarat.

Khan found the experience of creating sets for Ram-Leela "different" from his previous films. Bhansali and Khan spent about 2–3 months observing locations and discussed references and drawings. According to Khan, despite the decision to shoot half of the film on the sets and the other half in real locations, 90 percent of the film ended up shot on sets due to difficulties to shoot action sequences in real locations. Some of the sets were created in Reliance and Film City. Interior sets were created at Reliance while an exterior set used to show the mohallas, streets and markets was set in Film City. Khan and Bhansali travelled through villages in Gujarat and got references from the lifestyle, costumes and markets, which were used for putting together the sets. The set of the porn film parlour operated by Ram in the film has "neon-lit cut-outs and lurid poster art". The storage area of weapons are made so that the guns poke out of "straw baskets and from inside shimmering back-lit glass cases". The chamber in which Leela and Ram exchange messages has paintings of Raja Ravi Varma hung with "diaphanous curtains". The walls are rough hued and lined with glasswork patches.

The film's costumes were designed by Anju Modi and Maxima Basu  Modi designed Padukone's clothes while Basu designed costumes for the rest of the cast. Designer Sabyasachi Mukherjee, who previously worked with Bhansali on Black, was hired initially for the costumes of the leading lady, but was later replaced by Anju Modi. Bhansali asked Basu to create a trial look; impressed with it, he chose the design for Singh's character Ram. Ram's look was inspired by Rabari tribesmen. Ram was a character who was "exposed to the world" yet resides in a village in Kutch, making his clothes have duality. According to Basu, "for every ripped jeans or boots he sports, you also see him flaunting a kediyu and kohl-rimmed eyes." The jeans worn by Singh in "Tattad Tattad" were personally worked on by Basu; she ripped the jeans and added the embellishments herself.

Modi journeyed to the Bhoj region of Kutch and bought pieces of antique textiles from the villagers; she had to "mix and match" it with new fabric to create singular outfits.
This was done to make Padukone's outfit "as authentic as possible". Speaking about using the antique textiles, she said, "I wanted to use those old, antique fabrics because it's impossible to replicate the authenticity of those colors, the brocades and those beautiful, fine embroideries that were done by hand." The fabric from which the costume worn by Padukone in the song "Ishqyaun Dhishqyaun" was over 100 years old. Jewellery was taken from Amrapali Jewels, who lend their antique archives for shooting; these were not for sale. The dialogues of the film were written by Sr. Manager Sawan Vyas

After Modi was finalised as the costume designer, she was sent the script for studying the character of Leela. According to Modi, Leela's costumes changed as the film progressed: "the attire becomes more mature and darker and she’s shown in closed neck, long blouses." For the song 'Lahu Munh Lag Gaya', antique Kutch fabric was woven in the skirt worn by Padukone that showed through.
For the promotional poster, Modi created a 30 kilo lehenga. Modi also designed Chopra's costume, speaking of the difference with Padukone's costume, she said, "Priyanka’s character is that of a mujrewali or courtesan... since the characteristics of a mujrewali are understood – they are sexy, desirable – the outfit I made for Priyanka was very fitted to the body but still had to look Gujarati."

Principal photography

Initially shot in Gujarat, some sequences of Ram-Leela were shot in Udaipur, particularly at Udaipur palace and Gangaur Ghat where a song sequence was shot. The story of the film is set in Gujarat. In Udaipur, Singh shot a song sequence in freezing cold water for about 45 minutes. Padukone was injured on set; however she had to continue shooting as an expensive set was put up at Film City for the song "Nagada Sang Dhol." Sanjay Leela Bhansali had set up a gym on the sets in Filmcity Mumbai for the lead actor Ranveer Singh to not be late for the shooting and to avoid any delays for the movie.

For the song 'Tattad Tattad', Singh had 30 trials for his costume, after which Bhansali suggested that he shoot shirtless. The classic balcony and conflict scenes were among those that were recreated from Romeo and Juliet. For a few boat sequences in the film, shooting took place at Lake Pichola. While shooting the song Ram Chahe Leela with Chopra, she rehearsed the Indian choreography within four days and completed her shoot. Singh shot Ram-Leela simultaneously with Gunday; due to an injury from shooting Gunday, Bhansali had to postpone the shoot of some scenes.

In February 2013, the cinematographer Ravi Varman injured himself on set and suffered a fracture on his hand, leading to shooting being postponed till April. When asked about why Ram-Leela was planned to be shot almost entirely in real locations and not sets, Bhansali said, "street rowdyism and gulli-mein-hungama, the desert and the lake" were elements present in the film. He contrasted the planned shooting with that of his previous venture Saawariya, which was entirely shot on sets constructed in a studio. Labelling outdoor shooting as "a big challenge" he added that shooting with different kinds of architecture was "interesting". He felt that putting the lead pair in a real space was "liberating" and that he reacted to spaces "very differently", while noting that parts of Hum Dil De Chuke Sanam and Guzaarish were shot on real locations. Despite the intent to shoot the film in real locations, most of the film was shot on sets due to difficulties.

Soundtrack

The soundtrack album is composed by Sanjay Leela Bhansali, which is his second film after Guzaarish (2010), and lyrics were written by Siddharth–Garima. Monty Sharma composed the background score. The album features eleven songs, except one track "Mor Bani Thanghat Kare" is a 1944 Gujarati song translated by Jhaverchand Meghani and composed by Hemu Gadhavi. The remaining tracks were composed by Bhansali himself. The soundtrack album was released on 2 October 2013 after a delay due to Ranveer Singh's health issues.

Daily News and Analysis gave the album four stars out of five and called it "a feast for music lovers"  and writes, "Bhansali adds grandeur to the album with his compositions but at the same time gives enough space to the singers to shine." Yashika Mathur of Business Standard stated, "The strong point of the "Ram-Leela" album is the soft romantic songs. Bhansali has put his best 'musical' foot forward." Joginder Tuteja of Rediff.com stated, "With just about everything working for the music of Ram Leela, what with classical, folk, fusion as well as contemporary sound finding their place under the sun, Bhansali makes sure that the soundtrack stands out from the clutter of some below average music of some notable biggies that have been making the rounds."

Marketing and release
The first teaser of the poster, featuring the lead actors standing on a cluster guns, was released in January 2013. The release date was revealed by Padukone on her Twitter account. On 16 September 2013, an official poster was released; the trailer launch took place on the same day. At the launch, a special rangoli poster of the film was created. Divya Goya of Indian Express writes, "The film promises to be high on drama and violence as this time 'Love is at War'." It also attracted praise from actor Amitabh Bachchan.

Some religious groups opposed the movie claiming that the former title Ramleela was misleading because the movie had nothing to do with Ramlila, traditional enactment of the life and story of Hindu deity, Lord Rama. A local court in Mumbai has issued an "ex-parte ad-interim stay" over the use of term Ramleela in the movie title. A Delhi court, on 12 November, stayed the release of the movie as per suit filed by six petitioners, including Prabhu Samaj Dharmik Ram Leela Committee, saying the movie hurt the religious sentiments of Hindus. The film's title was changed to Goliyon Ki Raasleela Ram-Leela, leading to the court lifting the stay order and the film releasing on the fixed date.

Ram-Leela released on 14 November 2013. The film got widest release 2000+ screens in domestic market and 550 screens in overseas and worldwide with around 2550 screens. Kshatriya community opposed usage of community names in the movie, so Jadeja and Rabari community titles were changed to Saneda and Rajadi. On 21 November 2013, Lucknow bench of Allahabad High Court banned the movie in Uttar Pradesh. Ram-Leela had its television premiere on Set Max.

Reception

Critical reception
Ram-Leela received positive critical reviews. Taran Adarsh from Bollywood Hungama gave four and a half stars out of five, writing, "Goliyon Ki Raasleela ought to be watched for multiple reasons: the electrifying chemistry between its lead actors, the strong dramatic content, the scintillating musical score, the violent streak in the narrative and of course, Sanjay Leela Bhansali's execution of the material." Meena Iyer of The Times of India gave the movie 4 out of 5 stars, stating that the film has "nice doses of raunch and ras" and praised the performances of the cast and "precision" of certain scenes, while noting that the build up of romance could have been better. Writing for Firstpost, Mihir Fadnavis said, "The direction, outstanding production design, gorgeous cinematography are supported by a surprisingly strong cast, and Padukone is a wild-eyed anchor in a sea of formula. Three years ago you'd never have expected her to improve so drastically and command the kind of energy she does now."

Shubha Shetty-Saha of Mid-Day gave four stars out of five and labelled the film "a must watch", praising the performances of Pathak, Padukone, Singh, Kelkar, Chaddha and Bisht but felt that Devaviah's talent "seems wasted". Writing for RogerEbert.com, Danny Bowes gave the film 3 out of 4 stars and praised Padukone's performance, writing, "It is Padukone, as is increasingly the case, who steals the show with pure, deliberate, ferocious star power. The striking thing about her performance as Leela is how tightly coiled and tense it seems; she's ready at a moment's notice to kiss or kill (or both), never passive, never merely a photographic subject." Rajeev Masand of CNN-IBN gave the film three and a half stars out of five and appreciated the chemistry between the lead pair, writing "Deepika and Ranveer scorch up the screen in their romantic scenes, their intense passion a bold change from Bollywood's mostly tame embraces", and called the film "far more engaging than the lazy blockbusters we've seen lately."

David Chute of Variety praised the dance numbers, writing, "The most effective sequences the two stars have together are the large-scale dance numbers, which are beautifully and imaginatively staged."
Sarita Tanwar of DNA gave the movie 3.5 out of 5 stars and wrote "Ram Leela is a lovely mixture of the familiar and the fresh. The technical aspects of the film are extraordinary: breath-taking sets, spellbinding cinematography, perfect music and a wonderful supporting cast. Deepika is perfect in every scene. Ranveer has surrendered to the director's vision and delivers a power-packed performance."
Gayatri Shankar of Zee News called the film "first-rate" and praised the visuals and performances of Singh and Padukone, labelling it "one of the finest performances of their careers."
However, she found certain portions "a little hard to believe". Anupama Chopra of Hindustan Times gave the movie 3 out of 5 stars and writes: "Deepika has stolen the show from her heroes, but this one, I think, belongs to Ranveer. He’s flamboyant and cheerfully vulgar but also vulnerable and broken."

Shubhra Gupta of The Indian Express gave the movie 2.5 out of 5 stars, concluding "'Ram-Leela' creates a couple that ignites the screen, and most of the time when these two are on screen, you keep watching. It's when the guns come on, and the gun-masters start roaring and shouting, that the love-story drowns, and everything gets both too noisy and too choreographed." Writing for NDTV, Saibal Chatterjee gave the film two stars out of five and calls the film "all body and no soul." Raja Sen gave one star out of five and called the film "an overplotted, bloody mess", criticising the dialogues as "very poor... awful rhymes alternated with soap-operatic exposition". He criticised Singh's performance, while calling Padukone "something worth staring at".

Box office
Ram-Leela collected 1.52 billion in India and  491 million, for a total worldwide gross of 2.01 billion. As of February 2018, the film is the fifth highest grossing Indian film of 2015 in India, the sixth highest grossing Indian film of 2015 overseas, and the fifth highest grossing Indian film of 2015 worldwide.

Ram-Leela had a strong first day with collections of over  despite limited release due to controversies.

The movie collected US$450,000 (approximately 28.3 million) in North America on Friday, vis-à-vis US$311,000 (approximately 19.5 million) earned by Krrish 3. It also earned A$66,365 (approximately 3.91 million) in Australia in two days, beating A$58,283 (approximately 3.435 million) collected by the latter. In UAE-GCC, the movie opened with AED 1.3 million (approximately 22.2 million). It also collected £87,000 (approximately 8.826 million) in the UK on Friday, debuting at #9 in the chart and two days' collection in New Zealand stands at NZ$12,869 (673,000). The film's overseas figures were around the $4 million mark in the first weekend. The collections abroad are $7.25 million in seventeen days. Ram-Leela collected US$7.6 million overseas after its fourth weekend.

Accolades

Filmfare Awards
 Winner, Best Actress : Deepika Padukone
 Winner, Best Actress in a Supporting Role : Supriya Pathak
 Winner, Best Choreography : Samir and Arsh Tanna – Lahu Muh Lag Gaya
 Nominated, Best Film : Goliyon Ki Raasleela Ram-Leela
 Nominated, Best Director : Sanjay Leela Bhansali
 Nominated, Best Actor : Ranveer Singh
 Nominated, Best Music Director : Sanjay Leela Bhansali
 Nominated, Best Female Playback Singer : Shreya Ghoshal – Nagada Sang Dhol

IIFA Awards
 Winner, Best Makeup : Vikram Gaikwad
 Winner, Best Art Direction : Wasiq Khan
 Nominated, Best Film : Goliyon Ki Raasleela Ram-Leela
 Nominated, Best Director : Sanjay Leela Bhansali
 Nominated, Best Actor : Ranveer Singh
 Nominated, Best Actress: Deepika Padukone
 Nominated, Best Actress in Supporting Role: Richa Chadda
 Nominated, Best Performance in a Negative Role: Supriya Pathak
 Nominated, Best Female Playback Singer: Bhoomi Trivedi – "Ram Chahe Leela"

Screen Awards
 Winner, Screen Award for Best Actress : Deepika Padukone
 Winner, Most Popular Actress Female : Deepika Padukone (also includes her work in Chennai Express and Yeh Jawaani Hai Deewani) 
 Winner, Best Costume Design : Anju Modi and Maxima Basu
 Winner, Best Production Design : Wasiq Khan
 Winner, Best Cinematography : S. Ravi Varman
 Nominated, Best Film : Bhansali Productions
 Nominated, Best Director : Sanjay Leela Bhansali
 Nominated, Screen Award for Best Supporting Actress : Richa Chadda
 Nominated, Screen Award for Best Actor (Popular Choice) : Ranveer Singh
 Nominated, Best Actor in a Negative Role (Female): Supriya Pathak
 Nominated, Best Choreography : Sameer and Arsh Tanna – Nagada Sang Dhol

Apsara Film & Television Producers Guild Awards
 Winner, Apsara Award for Best Art Direction : Rashid Khan
 Winner, Apsara Award for Best Singer – Female : Bhoomi Trivedi " Ram Chahe Leela"
 Winner, Apsara Award for Best Costume Design : Maxima Basu & Anju Modi
 Winner, Apsara Award for Best Performance in a Negative Role : Supriya Pathak
 Nominated, Apsara Award for Best Director : Sanjay Leela Bhansali 
 Nominated, Apsara Award for Best Actor in a Leading Role: Ranveer Singh
 Nominated, Apsara Award for Best Actress in a Leading Role: Deepika Padukone
 Nominated, Apsara Award for Best Film :
 Nominated, Apsara Award for Best Screenplay : Siddharth-Garima & Sanjay Leela Bhansali
 Nominated, Apsara Award for Best Dialogue : Siddharth- Garima
 Nominated, Apsara Award for Best Choreography : Vishnu Deva – "Ishqyaun Dhishqyuan" & "Ram Chahe Leela"
 Nominated, Apsara Award for Best Music : Sanjay Leela Bhansali
 Nominated, Apsara Award for Best Singer – Male : Aditya Narayan- Tattad Tattad & Ishqyaun Dhishqyuan
 Nominated, Apsara Award for Best Actress in a Supporting Role : Richa Chadda

BIG Star Entertainment Awards
 Winner, Best Action Film : Sanjay Leela Bhansali
 Winner, Most Entertaining Singer Female : Bhoomi Trivedi-Ram Chahe Leela
 Winner, Most Entertaining Music : Sanjay Leela Bhansali
 Nominated, Most Entertaining Director : Sanjay Leela Bhansali 
 Nominated, Most Entertaining Film of the Year 2013 – Sanjay Leela Bhansali
 Nominated, Most Entertaining Actor in a Romantic Film – Male : Ranveer Singh
 Nominated, Most Entertaining Actor in a Romantic Film – Female : Deepika Padukone
 Nominated, Most Entertaining Actor (Film) – Female : Deepika Padukone
 Nominated, Most Entertaining Actor (Film) – Male : Ranveer Singh
 Nominated, Most Entertaining Dancer (Male & Female)- Deepika Padukone : "Nagada Sang Dhol" and Priyanka Chopra : "Ram Chahe Leela"
 Nominated, Most Entertaining Singer Female – Shreya Ghoshal :  "Nagada Sang Dhol"
 Nominated, Most Entertaining Singer Male – Aditya Narayan : "Tattad Tattad"
 Nominated, Most Entertaining Song – "Nagada Sang Dhol"

Zee Cine Awards
 Winner, Best Actor in a Negative Role : Supriya Pathak
 Nominated, Best Film : Sanjay Leela Bhansali
Nominated, Best Actor – Male : Ranveer Singh
Nominated, Best Actor – Female : Deepika Padukone
Nominated, Best Playback Singer – Female : Bhoomi Trivedi – Ram Chahe Leela

Lions Gold Awards
 Winner, Best Male Actor : Ranveer Singh

Mirchi Music Awards
 Winner, Upcoming Female Vocalist of The Year : Bhoomi Trivedi – "Ram Chahe Leela"
 '''Winner, Upcoming Lyricist of The Year : Siddharth-Garima – "Laal Ishq"

Notes

References

External links

2013 films
2010s Hindi-language films
Indian romantic drama films
2013 romantic drama films
Films set in Gujarat
Films shot in Gujarat
Films based on Romeo and Juliet
Films directed by Sanjay Leela Bhansali
Films shot in Rajasthan